KKSD (104.3 FM) is a radio station broadcasting a classic hits format. Licensed to Milbank, South Dakota, United States, the station serves the Watertown, South Dakota area.  The station is owned and operated by Alpha Media after it purchased the stations of Digity, LLC.

History
The station was assigned the call sign KMSD-FM on 1989-09-20.  On 1991-04-15, the station changed its call sign to KPHR and on 1998-05-15 to the current KKSD.

KKSD ran a classic rock format as "104.3 The Fox" for many years, and flipped to its "Hippie Radio 104.3" classic hits format on January 1, 2013. The Hippie Radio branding was dropped in June 2018.

References

External links
Watertown Radio

KSD
Classic hits radio stations in the United States
Radio stations established in 1989
1989 establishments in South Dakota